The gulden was the currency of the Swiss canton of Luzern until 1798. It was subdivided into 40 schilling, each of 3 rappen or 6 angster.  Coins were also issued denominated in kreuzer and batzen. The French silver écu was equivalent to 3 gulden.

The French écu was also equivalent to 4 Franken of the Helvetic Republic, and afterwards to 4 Luzern franken.

Coins
In the late 18th century, copper coins were issued for 1 angster and 1 rappen, together with billon 1 schilling,  and 1 batzen. Silver coins were issued in denominations of 5 and 10 schilling, 20 and 40 kreuzer, and 20 and 40 batzen.

References

Modern obsolete currencies
Currencies of Switzerland
1798 disestablishments
Canton of Lucerne